Hunters Hot Springs are a group of hot springs in Lake County, Oregon.

Hunters Hot Springs may also refer to:
Hunters Hot Springs (Montana), hot springs in Park County, Montana, in the Paradise Valley
Hunters Hot Springs, Montana, an unincorporated community in Park County, Montana near the hot springs